RJF may refer to:

 Reichsbund jüdischer Frontsoldaten
 Reichsjugendführer Baldur von Schirach
 Raymond James Financial, Inc.
 Reines Jüdisches Fett
 Red Jacket Firearms LLC, manufacturer and seller of custom weapons located in Baton Rouge, Louisiana
 Robert James Fischer , American chess grandmaster and the eleventh World Chess Champion.